RMS Umbria and her sister ship  were the last two Cunard Line ocean liners that were fitted with auxiliary sails. Umbria as the last express steamship to be built for a North Atlantic route with a compound engine. By 1885, the triple expansion engine was the almost universal specification for newly built steamships. John Elder & Co. built Umbria in Govan, Glasgow in 1884. Umbria and her running mate Etruria were record breakers. They were the largest liners then in service, and they plied the Liverpool – New York City route.

Building

Umbria had two large funnels that gave the outward impression of great power. She had three large steel masts that were barquentine-rigged. Another innovation was that she was equipped with refrigeration machinery, but it was the single-screw propulsion that would bring the most publicity later in her career.

The ship epitomized the luxuries of Victorian style. The public rooms in the first class were full of ornately carved furniture, heavy velvet curtains hung in all the rooms, and they were decorated with the bric-a-brac that period fashion dictated. These rooms and the first-class cabins were situated on the promenade, upper, saloon, and main decks. There was also a music room, a smoking room for gentlemen, and separate dining rooms for first- and second-class passengers. By the standard of the day, the second-class accommodation was modest but spacious and comfortable.

Cunard registered Umbria at Liverpool. Her United Kingdom official number was 91159 and her code letters were JPWV.

By early October 1884 she had completed her sea trials and on 1 November 1884 she set off to New York City on her maiden voyage. She was commanded by Captain Theodore Cook, who was Cunard's senior captain.

Liverpool-to-New York service
RMS Umbria started her regular service to New York City from Liverpool. However, a series of crises brought her North Atlantic service to a halt temporarily.

Armed merchant cruiser
Since 1813, there had been tensions between the British Empire and the Russian Empire due to Russia's southward expansion into Afghanistan. Shortly after this date the dispute with Russia was settled, and Etruria was returned to the North Atlantic service, but Umbria was retained for a further six months as a precaution. She had been fitted with  guns and it was thought that should the need arise she would have been a powerful auxiliary to the new ironclad navy of the era.

Return to service
In September 1885 Umbria was released from government service and resumed the Atlantic service. She worked for the next few years without any major incident.

The Blue Riband
In 1887 Umbria gained the prestigious Blue Riband for the fastest crossing of the Atlantic between Europe and North America. when on 29 May she beat her sister ship's record of the year before. She set off from Queenstown (now Cobh) in Ireland to cross the North Atlantic, westbound. Her sister Etruria regained the Blue Riband the following year. On 10 November 1888 Umbria was outward bound from New York when she collided with and sank the Fabre Line cargo steamship Iberia near Sandy Hook. Iberias stern was completely cut off. The blame for this accident was placed upon Umbria, which it was said was travelling at a dangerous speed, said to be .

Magdalena
On 12 April 1890 Umbria set off on her usual voyage from New York City with 655 passengers aboard. Five days out, in mid-Atlantic she sighted the stricken Norwegian barque Magdalena. The barque had struck an iceberg and was waterlogged. She rescued Captain Gunderson and his crew of eight, and before abandoning ship Gunderson finished off Magdalena by setting fire to her. Four days later all were landed safely at Liverpool.

Propeller shaft failure
On 17 December 1892, Umbria left Liverpool with, after stopping at Queenstown, 400 passengers aboard along with a large amount of mail. She was due to arrive in New York on Christmas Day. By 28 December she still had not arrived and speculation as to what had delayed her was growing. News came on 29 December from the steamship Galileo, which had passed her on Christmas Day. She appeared disabled. The master of Galileo also reported that she displayed three red lights, indicating that she was unmanageable, but did not require assistance. The weather was said to be foul with a severe north-westerly gale. Another steamship called Monrovian had also passed her but reported Umbria to be in good shape. On 30 December the steamship Manhanset reported that again Umbria did not require assistance and that she was carrying out repairs to a broken shaft. In fact Umbrias troubles had started on 23 December at around 5:25 p.m. Her propeller shaft had fractured at the thrust block. Her main engines were stopped immediately, and Umbria drifted helplessly in gale-force winds and a heavy sea. The chief engineer worked relentlessly with his staff to make repairs to the shaft. Later that day at 8:15 pm the steamship Bohemia had agreed to tow the ship to New York, but the line broke around 10 p.m. in the severe storm and visibility was nil. Next morning there was no sign of Bohemia, and once again Umbria was drifting helplessly. Then came the encounters with the other two steamships, but by 26 December the Cunarder Gallia and Umbria had established contact with each other and after some communications between masters, Gallia had refused to stand by, and carried on her voyage; Umbria was left to make repairs. The chief engineer achieved this on 27 December and very slowly she set off for New York City. She arrived there at 11 p.m. on 31 December 1892, and her arrival was witnessed by thousands of New Yorkers who had gathered to cheer her safe arrival. When the excitement had died down the recriminations started, which ended when Cunard prepared a statement explaining why Gallia had continued on without assisting Umbria. Further repairs were carried out on Umbria and she returned to Liverpool on 4 February 1893. By 1 April she was back on the service.

Stuck in a wreck
In May 1896 the British steamship Vedra collided with and sank the coal-laden barge Andrew Jackson. At 9 a.m. on 28 June 1896 Umbria left her pier at the foot of Clarkson Street on the North River. After one hour she was in the ship channel near the turn into Gedney Channel,  from Sandy Hook. Here Umbria struck the sunken wreck of Andrew Jackson and became stuck fast. All day she remained stuck until the combination of a flood tide and the service of seven tugs managed to free her from the wreck, to the cheers of the Yale rowing crew who were aboard Umbria on their way to take part in the Henley Regatta. She dropped anchor and divers reported no damage to the ship, so she continued on her voyage.

The Boer War

War broke out in South Africa on 12 October 1899, and two months later on 22 December the UK government chartered Umbria and had her prepared to carry troops and arms to South Africa. She set started her first voyage to South Africa on on 11 January 1900. Aboard were troops of the Derbyshire, Durham Warwickshire Yeomanry. They reached Cape Town on 29 January and after calls at Port Elizabeth and other ports she returned to Southampton with wounded soldiers. In April she again was back in South Africa and during the relief of Mafeking she was in Port Natal (now Durban) for the celebrations. She left Cape Town for the last time on 7 June, carrying 600 wounded soldiers. She arrived back at Southampton 19 days later on 26 June, and she was then returned to Cunard to resume her normal role. She was given a complete refit and returned on the New York run on 21 July.

Mafia bomb plot
Both Umbria and Etruria returned to the Liverpool – New York service. On 9 May 1903 the New York City Police Department received a letter that said a bomb had been loaded aboard Umbria. The letter said the bomb had been intended for the White Star Line's , but that the bombers had changed their minds because there were a large number of women and children aboard that ship. At noon that day Umbria was still at her berth and she was due to sail. Immediately the police sealed off the pier head and told the captain to delay the sailing. The police searched the ship and found the bomb. One of the police officers tied a rope around the box and lowered it into the sea. When the box was lifted back up and opened, it was found to have  of dynamite attached to a crude timed fuse. If the bomb had exploded on the ship it would have caused considerable damage. The letter that the police had received also explained that the bomb plot was the work of the Mafia, whose aim was to destroy the British shipping interest in the port of New York. To corroborate this information the police had descriptions of two "Italian" men placing the bomb on the pier and the police eventually traced the manufacturer of the bomb back to a Chicago lodging house. The ship eventually got under way to Liverpool on 16 May.

Last voyage
Her last voyage started on 12 February 1910 and her return crossing on 23 February. She arrived in the Mersey for the last time on 4 March 1910, and as soon as her passengers had disembarked, work began on dismantling all her fixtures and fittings. Within days she was sold for scrap for £20,000 to the Forth Shipbreaking Company, and she was taken to Bo'ness, Scotland. In all she had made 145 round trips to New York.

In popular culture
The ship is featured briefly in the last several episodes of the third and final season of the horror-drama television series Penny Dreadful. When Sir Malcolm Murray, Ethan Chandler, and Kaetenay are returning to London from the United States, Umbria is the ship they are travelling aboard: as evidenced by the ships appearance, and the name on a life-preserver on the ship.

References

Bibliography

External links
 Cunard Line
 Umbria (1884–1910; 7,718 tons)
 Ships List, Umbria
 The Barque Magdalena
 Blue Riband record

1884 ships
Ocean liners of the United Kingdom
Ships of the Cunard Line
Steamships of the United Kingdom
Victorian-era passenger ships of the United Kingdom